Frank Colón (born October 13, 1951) is an American musician and martial artist of Puerto Rican descent.

Early life and education
Born in Washington, D.C., Colón moved from there to Puerto Rico at the age of five. His musical instruction began at age eleven, beginning with classical piano lessons, under the guidance of Angelina Figueroa and Rafael Figueroa. He also studied Brazilian percussion, guitar, electric bass, and trap drums. He was active in municipal and collegiate sports, martial arts, and amateur theater, and worked with various local pop music groups.

In 1970, he moved back to Washington, D.C. to attend college at American University, where he majored in Political Science. During this time, his musical orientation changed from melodic instruments to percussion. Finishing his university requirements, he turned full-time to music.

Music career 
In 1976, Colón moved to New York City to work with the drummer Julito Collazo. There he became proficient at playing the Batá drums.

Martial arts 
Colón is a practitioner of Tai chi, and an American pioneer black belt Senior Instructor in the Israeli self-defense system Krav-Maga, certified by the Wingate Institute of Israel and Krav-Maga International, Inc. He was the first elected Vice-President of the American Association of Krav maga Instructors (AAKMI), nowadays known as The Krav maga Federation. He currently holds the rank of Professor Black Belt Dan 2.

Discography

As leader
Live at Vartanjazz
Latin Wonder
Latin Lounge

As sideman

With Ray Anderson
Don't Mow Your Lawn (Enja, 1994)
With Gato Barbieri
Bahia (Fania, 1982)
With Mary J. Blige
My Life (Verve, 1994)
With George Clinton
By Way of the Drum (Hip-O Select, 2007)
With David Bennett Cohen
Cookin' With Cohen (Core, 2008)
With Barbara Dennerlein
Junkanoo (Verve, 1997)
With Charles Earland
Front Burner (Milestone, 1988)
With Michael Galasso
High Lines (ECM, 2005)
With Diem Jones
Equanimity (Dr. Woo, 2007)
With Babatunde Lea
Level of Intent (Motema Music, 1991)
With Tom Lellis
Southern Exposure (Adventure, 2003)
With Andrea Marcelli
Oneness (Lipstick, 1994)
With Tania Maria
The Real Tania Maria: WILD! (Concord, 1985)
Outrageously Wild! (Concord, 1993)
Heads and Tales (Enja, 1995)
With Airto Moreira
Aquí Se Puede (Montuno, 1986)
Samba De Flora (Montuno, 1988)
The Other Side of This (Rykodisc, 1992)
With Milton Nascimento
Missa Dos Quilombos (Ariola, 1982)
With Ivo Perelman
Children of Ibeji (Enja, 1991)
With Michel Petrucciani
Music (Blue Note, 1989)
The Blue Note Years (Blue Note, 1994)
With John R. Pollard
Passion, Poison, and Politik (PPP, 2002)
With Jennifer Richman
Flowers of Gold (MarcusW, 2006)
With Steve Sacks
Primeiro Sonho (AMJ, 1999)
With Wayne Shorter
Joy Ryder (Columbia, 1988)
Anima (Ariola, 1983)
Canta Brasil (Ariola, 1993)
Ao Vivo em Montreux (Ariola, 1983)
With Janis Siegel
The Tender Trap (Medici, 1999)
I Wish You Love (Telarc, 2002)
With Bob Stewart
Goin' Home (Verve, 2003)
With Robertinho Silva
Speak No Evil (Ariola, 1995)
Bodas De Prata (Gismonti, 1989)
With Tana/Reid
Blue Motion (Evidence, 1994)
With Towa Tei
Future Listening! (Elektra, 1995)
With Cecilia Tenconi
Tiger Lily (Cecitenco, 2007)
With Wagner Tiso
Ao Vivo em Montreux (Ariola, 1983)
With The Manhattan Transfer
Brasil (Atlantic, 1987)
The Offbeat of Avenues (Atlantic, 1991)
Vibrate (Telarc, 2004)
With Ernie Watts & Gilberto Gil
Afoxé (CTI, 1991)
With Michael Wolff
Intoxicate (Indianola, 2001)
Impure Thoughts (Razor & Tie, 2000)
Sexual Healing (Roving Spirits, 2002)

Filmography
Colón appeared on an HBO television special with Harry Belafonte, titled "Don't Stop the Music", taped in Winnipeg, Canada; a Disney Channel Special with The Manhattan Transfer, titled, "Going Home"; a TV special with Tania Maria for the "Ohne Filter" show, out of Baden-Baden, Germany; a Brazil TVE special with Milton Nascimento "Live in Montreux"; two appearances on The Tonight Show with The Manhattan Transfer – one with Johnny Carson and the other with Jay Leno; a special on WIPR-TV in Puerto Rico, featured with Tania Maria, performing in the Heineken Jazz Festival; an HBO broadcast of the 40th Anniversary of Atlantic Records, in Madison Square Garden; an appearance on the Good Morning America show (ABC TV) with The Manhattan Transfer, and various other appearances performing with his own band throughout Russia, Uzbekistan, Kyrgyzstan, Georgia and Moldova.

He also appeared in the film Calle 54 by director Fernando Trueba.

References

External links
 

1951 births
Living people
American University School of Public Affairs alumni
Musicians from Washington, D.C.
Planet Drum members